Adrian Eagle, born Adrian Naidu, is an Australian singer-songwriter. He is an ARIA Award winner and also a  winner of two categories in the SA Music Awards in 2019.

Early life
He was born in Adelaide to a Maltese mother and a Fiji-Indian father, with the surname Naidu. He has spoken frankly of his problems with anxiety, and his debut EP, Mama, pays homage to the women who have supported him, especially his mum, who raised him as a single mother.

Career
His first break came when his cover of "Redemption Song" was shared by rapper 360. He later collaborated with the Hilltop Hoods on their single "Clark Griswold". That song won them the 2018 ARIA for Best Urban Release.

He went on to release the singles "17 Again" and "A.O.K." (which both had national rotation on Triple J,) and his debut EP, Mama, in 2019. Adrian also covered Ocean Alley's Hottest 100 winning single "Confidence" for Triple J's Like A Version, which drew praise from Rihanna.

Adrian Eagle also appears as a guest vocalist on a range of hip hop artists' recordings, including Thundamentals, Fortay, K21 and Yorta Yorta artist DRMNGNOW.

Discography

Extended plays

Singles

As lead artist

As featured artist

Awards

ARIA Music Awards
The ARIA Music Awards is an annual awards ceremony that recognises excellence, innovation, and achievement across all genres of the music of Australia.

|-
| 2018
| "Clark Griswold" (with Hilltop Hoods)
| ARIA Award for Best Urban Album
| 
|-
| 2019
| "A.O.K."
| ARIA Award for Best Soul/R&B Release
| 
|-

South Australian Music Awards
The South Australian Music Awards (previously known as the Fowler's Live Music Awards) are annual awards that exist to recognise, promote and celebrate excellence in the South Australian contemporary music industry. They commenced in 2012.
 
|-
| 2018
| Adrian Eagle
| Best New Artist  
| 
|- 
| rowspan="2" | 2019
| Adrian Eagle
| Best Solo Artist  
| 
|- 
| "A-OK" by Adrian Eagle
| Best Release  
| 
|-

References

Further reading

External links
 
 
 

ARIA Award winners
Musicians from Adelaide
Living people
1992 births